Croft railway station was a railway station serving the village of Croft, Leicestershire in Leicestershire. The line is owned by Network Rail.

History
The station was opened on 1 December 1877 by the London North Western Railway, at a cost of £1209.

British Railways closed the station on 4 March 1968.

The station was of timber, modular construction similar to that of the LNWR on the Rugby to Stamford Railway, with simple timber braces to support the awning. Access was from the main driveway and footpaths from the adjacent footbridge. Although the Down platform was removed in 1950, steps from Arbor Road led here. In 1885, the booking office was extended to the west to provide a goods office, this time in concrete, mined from the local Granite company. A Station Master's house was provided in 1892, built on the west side of Station Road. The platforms were faced in local granite and extended in 1904 and again in 1922. The station was a popular entry into the LNWR gardens competition, but all disappeared upon closure on 4 March 1968. The Station Masters house and cottages remain after suffragettes set fire to the station in 1914.

References

Disused railway stations in Leicestershire
Former London and North Western Railway stations
Railway stations in Great Britain opened in 1877
Railway stations in Great Britain closed in 1968
Beeching closures in England